Garamendi is a Basque surname. Notable people with the surname include:

John Garamendi (born 1945), American businessman and politician
Olatz Garamendi (born 1968), Spanish politician

Basque-language surnames